See Kata for "Form" as used in the context of martial arts.

Form is a specific way of performing a movement, often a strength training exercise, to avoid injury, prevent cheating and increase strength.

'Proper form'
Exercises or drills in sport have a recognized way of performing the movements that have two purposes:

Avoiding injury
By using proper or 'good and' form, the risk of injury is lowered. A lack of proper form commonly results in injury or a lack of effect from the exercise being performed

Maximize benefit
Good form ensures that the movement only uses the main muscles, and avoids recruiting secondary muscles.  As a muscle fatigues, the body attempts to compensate by recruiting other muscle groups and transferring force generation to non-fatigued units.  This reduces the benefits in strength or size gain experienced by the muscles as they are not worked to failure.

References

Physical exercise